Mehnan (also Romanized as Mehnān; also known as Mehnān-e Bālā, Mehnān Bālā, and Qamparānlū) is a village in Aladagh Rural District, in the Central District of Bojnord County, North Khorasan Province, Iran. At the 2006 census, its population was 1,341, in 326 families.

References 

Populated places in Bojnord County